Mary's Start in die Ehe, also known as Ich bleib' bei dir, is a 1931 German romantic comedy film directed by Johannes Meyer and starring Jenny Jugo, Hermann Thimig and Hermann Vallentin. The film's sets were designed by the art director Erich Zander. It was remade the following year as There Goes the Bride, a British film starring Jessie Matthews.

Cast
 Jenny Jugo
 Hermann Thimig
 Hermann Vallentin
 Eva Speyer
 Fritz Odemar
 Eva Schmid-Kayser
 Hansi Arnstaedt
 Kurt Lilien
 Martha Ziegler
 S.O. Schoening
 Willy Roxin
 Richard Ludwig
 Max Wilmsen
 Karl Junge-Swinburne

References

Bibliography

External links

1931 films
1931 romantic comedy films
German romantic comedy films
Films of the Weimar Republic
1930s German-language films
Films directed by Johannes Meyer
German black-and-white films
1930s German films